SS Hugh J. Kilpatrick was a Liberty ship built in the United States during World War II. She was named after Hugh J. Kilpatrick, an officer in the Union Army during the American Civil War, achieving the rank of brevet major general. He was later the United States Minister to Chile.

Construction
Hugh J. Kilpatrick was laid down on 21 April 1944, under a Maritime Commission (MARCOM) contract, MC hull 2480, by the St. Johns River Shipbuilding Company, Jacksonville, Florida; she was sponsored by Laura Consuelo Landa, granddaughter of the namesake, and was launched on 31 May 1944.

History
She was allocated to the States Marine Corp., on 22 June 1944. She was sold for commercial use, 21 October 1946, to American Union Transport, Inc., for $558,118.52 and renamed Hoosier State. After several name and owner changes she was scrapped in South Korea, in 1969.

References

Bibliography

 
 
 
 

 

Liberty ships
Ships built in Jacksonville, Florida
1944 ships